Thriving is a condition beyond mere survival, implying growth and positive development.

Youth development 
The synthesis of existing lines of research has given  a lens through which to view research, theory, and practice in the field of youth development. Whereas positive youth development theory has focused on resiliency and competence, thriving encourages youth development researchers, scholars, and practitioners to view youth as community and social assets to be nurtured and developed. 4-H Center for Youth Development researchers, Heck, Subramaniam, and Carlos (2010), capture it this way: “Thriving is intentional and purposeful. It connotes optimal development across a variety of life domains, such as social, academic and professional/career development, towards a positive purpose.”

Thriving in youth is an upward trajectory marked by: The knowledge of and ability to tap into inner sources of motivation, or spark (Benson, 2008); an incremental, growth mindset oriented towards learning (Dweck, 2006); and the goal management skills necessary to succeed and grow. Youth who are on the path to reaching their fullest potential possess the following indicators of thriving: Love of learning; life skills; healthy habits; emotional competence; social skills; positive relationships; spiritual growth; character; caring; confidence; persistent resourcefulness; and purpose.

Despite the concept of thriving having existed in clinical and medical literature and research for many years, its application to positive youth development has evolved more recently. Starting in 2000, the Thrive Foundation for Youth stimulated a study of thriving within the field of positive youth development. Making significant investments in scientific research to define thriving in youth and ways that caring adults can encourage youth thriving trajectories. The Thrive Foundation for Youth funded prominent scientists in the field of positive youth development to define thriving and indicators of thriving.

The University of California 4-H Youth Development Program is the first youth development organization in the country to utilize the thriving framework and concepts on a large scale basis, focusing on statewide youth-adult partnership training and positive youth outcome evaluation.

See also 
Eudaimonia
Failure to thrive
Well-being
Child rearing
Juvenile delinquency in the United States

References

Further reading 

 Benson, P. L., & Scales, P. C. (in press). “The Definition and Measurement of Thriving in Adolescence.” Journal of Positive Psychology.
 Damon, W. (2008). "The Path to Purpose." New York: Free Press.
 King, P. E.; Dowling, E. M.; Mueller, R. A.; White, K.; Schultz, W.; Osborn, P.; Dickerson, E.; Bobeck, D. L.; Lerner, R. M.; Benson, P. L.; & Scales, P. C. (2005). “Thriving in Adolescence: The Voices of Youth-Serving Practitioners, Parents, and Early and Late Adolescents. Journal of Early Adolescence, 25, 94–112.
 Lerner, R. (2007). "The Good Teen." New York: Three Rivers Press.
 Scales, P. C., & Benson, P. L. (2005). “Adolescence and Thriving.” In C. B. Fisher & R. M. Lerner, Eds., Encyclopedia of Applied Developmental Science, vol. I (pp. 15–19). Thousand Oaks: Sage.
 Scales, P. C., Benson, P. L., Leffert, N., & Blyth, D. A. (2000). “Contribution of Developmental Assets to the Prediction of Thriving among Adolescents.” Applied Developmental Science, 4, 27–46.

Youth work
Child development